Men Against the Sun is a 1952 British historical adventure film directed by Brendan J. Stafford and starring John Bentley and Zena Marshall. It depicts the attempts to construct a railway in late Victorian Africa. It was shot on location in Kenya. This was unusually ambitious for a second feature film at the time.

Main cast
 John Bentley as Hawker  
 Zena Marshall as Elizabeth  
 Liam O'Leary as Farher Dowling  
 Alan Tarlton as Tanner  
 Edward Johnson as Salim

See also
 Killers of Kilimanjaro (1959)

References

Bibliography
 Chibnall, Steve & McFarlane, Brian. The British 'B' Film. Palgrave MacMillan, 2009.

External links

1952 films
1950s historical adventure films
British historical adventure films
Films shot in Kenya
Films set in the 1890s
British black-and-white films
Films scored by Eric Spear
1950s English-language films
1950s British films